"Somebody's Baby" is a song written by Jackson Browne and Danny Kortchmar and recorded by Browne for the 1982 Fast Times at Ridgemont High movie soundtrack.  Reaching No. 7 on the US Billboard Hot 100 after debuting at No. 73 on July 31, 1982, the track would be Browne's last top ten hit, as well as the highest-charting single of his career, spending a total of nineteen weeks on the chart.

The song reached No. 14 on the Billboard Adult Contemporary chart, as well. In Canada, "Somebody's Baby" peaked at #16. The single was also released in Italy, Spain and Japan.

Cash Box said that "Browne has come up with a most appealing first single from the soundtrack to Fast Times At Ridgemont High." Billboard called it a "midtempo rocker" which was not one of Browne's "most arresting compositions" but would still "appeal to pop and AOR formats."

It has since been released on several of Browne's greatest hits albums, including The Next Voice You Hear: The Best of Jackson Browne and The Very Best of Jackson Browne.  An unplugged acoustic version appears on Browne's album entitled Solo Acoustic, Vol. 2 (2008).

Personnel 
 Jackson Browne – lead vocals
 Craig Doerge – electric piano, synthesizers, clavinet
 Doug Haywood – Hammond organ, harmony vocals
 Danny Kortchmar – guitar (right channel)
 Rick Vito – guitar (left channel)
 Bob Glaub – bass
 Russ Kunkel – drums

Charts

Weekly charts

Year-end charts

Other versions
Artist Sidney Gish released a cover of the song in 2019 as a part of Cavetown's Animal Kingdom series
American rock band Yo La Tengo released a version on the 1988 compilation album entitled Human Music (HMS100) (Homestead Records).
It was covered by Andru Donalds for the soundtrack for Good Will Hunting (1997).
Phantom Planet covered the song for the movie soundtrack Not Another Teen Movie (2001).
Country music singer-songwriter Eric Heatherly covered the song on his album 2 High 2 Cry (2009).
Spoken word poet and rapper B. Dolan featured the song on his concept album The Failure (2008).
Free Energy covered the song in 2013, and made it available on YouTube and SoundCloud.
Have Mercy covered the song for their portion of the 2015 split EP, with Somos.

References 

1982 singles
Jackson Browne songs
Songs written by Jackson Browne
Songs written by Danny Kortchmar
Songs written for films
1982 songs
Asylum Records singles
Song recordings produced by Jackson Browne